Druzhny may refer to:

 Druzhny, Republic of Adygea, a settlement in the Republic of Adygea, Russia
 USS Yarnall (DD-143), called Druzhny during its Soviet commission in 1944–1952

See also 
 Druzhnaya (disambiguation)
 Druzhnoye, Amur Oblast, Russia